WPXB-LD, virtual channel 50 and UHF digital channel 17, is a low-powered Daystar owned-and-operated station licensed to Daytona Beach, Florida, United States. The station is owned by Word of God Fellowship, parent company of the Daystar Television Network. WPXB-LD's transmitter is located near Indian Lake within the Tiger Bay State Forest.

History
The station signed on on December 4, 1998, as W42AM, later W57CV. It changed call letters to WPXB-LP in 2002.

On July 8, 2009, WPXB flash-cut its signal to digital as WPXB-LD.

Sometime until 2014, WPXB-LD served as a translator of Orlando-based Pax TV (now Ion Television) owned-and-operated station WOPX-TV (channel 56) that relayed WOPX's programming to areas of east-central Florida that received a marginal to non-existent signal from WOPX, although there were significant overlap between the two stations' contours otherwise. WPXB-LD was a straight simulcast of WOPX-TV; on-air references to WPXB-LD were limited to Federal Communications Commission (FCC)-mandated hourly station identifications during programming. Aside from the transmitter, WPXB-LD did not maintain any physical presence locally in Daytona Beach.

On December 15 of that year, West Palm Beach-based Ion Media Networks, owner or WOPX-TV, reached a deal to donate WPXB-LD to Word of God Fellowship, parent company of the Daystar television network

Digital channel

References

External links

Low-power television stations in the United States
Daystar (TV network) affiliates
PXB-LD
1989 establishments in Florida
Television channels and stations established in 1989